Yamanevler is an underground station of the M5 line of the Istanbul Metro in Üsküdar. It is located beneath Alemdağ Avenue in the Atatkent neighborhood of Ümraniye. Connection to IETT city buses is available from at street level. From its opening in December 2017 until October 2018, Yamanevler station was the eastern terminus of the M5 until the line was extended further to Çekmeköy.

The station consists of an island platform with two tracks. Since the M5 is an ATO line, protective gates on each side of the platform open only when a train is in the station. Yamanevler station was opened on 15 December 2017, together with eight other stations from Üsküdar.

Station layout

References

Railway stations opened in 2017
Istanbul metro stations
Üsküdar
2017 establishments in Turkey